KRG Capital is a private equity firm focused on leveraged buyouts and more recently mezzanine capital in middle-market companies across a range of industries.

The firm, which is based in Denver, Colorado, was founded in 1996.  The firm also maintains satellite offices in Mill Valley, California and Las Vegas, Nevada.  The firm has raised approximately $3.3 billion since inception across five funds including four private equity funds and a mezzanine capital fund.  KRG completed fundraising for its most recent private equity fund in 2007 with $2.0 billion of investor commitments.  KRG's Fund I was raised in 1999, Fund II was raised in 2001 and Fund III was raised in 2005 with $715 million of capital.

The firm was named for its three founding partners, Mark King, Bruce Rogers and Charles Gwirtsman.

In December 2014, the firm put on sale Fort Dearborn Co., a maker of consumer-products labels, for $750 million.

References

External links

KRG Capital (company website)

Private equity firms of the United States
Financial services companies established in 1996